The Bolaman Castle is a historic castle located at Bolaman town of Fatsa in Ordu Province, Turkey.

Castle
It sits on the rock at a pointed peninsula overlooking the sea. Its construction date is unknown. However, it is believed that the castle was built by the Kingdom of Pontus as a fortress to serve the purpose of a watchtower. 

The castle consist of inner and the outer walls made of ashlar. There are watchtowers on the outer walls around the courtyard. Inside the castle, there is a chapel in the form of a basilica.

Museum and restaurant
In the 18th century, a wooden mansion with two huge bay windows at two ends was built by a native family on the inner castle. Known as the "Kademoğlu Mansion", this typical Ottoman architectural house is a landmark of Fatsa. After its originally restoration by the Ministry of Culture and Tourism in 2009, the mansion is used as an ethnographic museum and a restaurant for regional cuisine under the name "Haznedaroğlu Mansion".

References 

Castles in Turkey
Museums in Ordu Province
Historic house museums in Turkey
Museums established in 2009
Restaurants in Turkey
Ancient Greek archaeological sites in Turkey
Buildings and structures in Ordu Province
Fatsa District